Mauka can refer to different things:

Mauka Mauka, an Indian television advertisement campaign
Mauka (snail), a subgenus of snail in the genus Philonesia
Mirabilis expansa, a plant and vegetable which has the common name of 'mauka'

See also
Mawk'allaqta (disambiguation), several archaeological sites in Peru
Mauka Taray, another archaeological site in Peru
Mililani Mauka, Hawaii
'ohe mauka, common name for Polyscias oahuensis, a Hawaiian tree